Vegetal, the adjectival form of vegetable, can be
Vegetal (wine), a descriptive term used in wine tasting
Végétal, the second studio album by singer-songwriter Émilie Simon
the vegetal pole in biology, see Polarity in embryogenesis

See also
Vegetale, a 1997 album by the French band Ulan Bator